Nicole Arendt and Kristine Radford were the defending champions but did not compete that year.

Claudia Porwik and Irina Spîrlea won in the final 6–2, 6–3 against Laurence Courtois and Nancy Feber.

Seeds
Champion seeds are indicated in bold text while text in italics indicates the round in which those seeds were eliminated. The top four seeded teams received byes into the second round.

Draw

Final

Top half

Bottom half

References
 1995 Danamon Open Doubles Draw

Danamon Open
1995 WTA Tour